The Government of Jersey is the executive body of the States of Jersey and is the central government of the Bailiwick of Jersey. The government is led by the Chief Minister (currently Kristina Moore, since 2022), who nominates all the remaining ministers, all elected by the States Assembly.

All Ministers of the Government are required to be elected States members and are accountable to it. They make statements in and take questions from the assembly. The government is dependent on the assembly to make primary legislation, however ministers can make secondary legislation, such as Orders and Regulations. The government is not formed of one single party, but made of multiple independent members.

The 'Government of Jersey' is the official identity of the executive and administrative arm of the States of Jersey. The government no longer uses the term States of Jersey in reference to executive and administrative departments.

History 

Under the uncodified constitution of Jersey, executive power lies in the Council of Ministers, formed of the Chief Minister and his ministers. Before 2005, the States of Jersey held both legislative and executive power through committee-led government

Since the implementation of the States of Jersey (Jersey) Law 2005, the executive and legislative functions have been split between the Council of Ministers and States Assembly respectively. In 2019, the Council of Ministers formally adopted the identity of the 'Government of Jersey' for the executive responsibilities of the States.

Ministers 

The decision-making body for the island's government is the Council of Ministers. The Council lead the island's executive and administrative governance. The ministers are nominated by the Chief Minister or by any States member and confirmed by the States Assembly. The States of Jersey (Jersey) Law 2005 establishes the role and function of ministers.

The administration of the Government is made up by a number of departments that may have more than one minister. The Ministers are responsible each for an area of policy. The Ministers provide policy direction to civil service officers, having given fair consideration and due weight to informed and impartial advice from such officer.

A new (or existing) Chief Minister is (re-)appointed after:

 every ordinary election of Deputies
 the previous Chief Minister ceases to be a States member
 the previous Chief Minister resigns, is incapacitated (for a period exceeding 8 weeks) or is deceased
 the States have no confidence in the Chief Minister or the whole Council

One Government 
Under the 'One Government' structure implemented by former Government Chief Executive Charlie Parker, there are nine government departments.

In April 2018, the States approved changes to the Government machinery. The Chief Executive was appointed the Principal Accounting Officer for public finances, giving them the control and responsibility for government spending. The Government states this change has improved funding allocations and government transparency. In February 2022, the Democratic Accountability and Governance Sub-Committee.

The same proposition also proposed to make the Government a single legal entity. Currently, each Minister forms a single corporation sole, however when the changes are implemented (as they have been approved), 'Jersey Ministers' as a single entity will become legally responsible for all areas of government. The argument in favour of this is that it will allow more cross-Ministerial working. However, some are worried that this move would lead to more centralisation of power in the Chief Minister and Chief Executive.

The OneGovernment structure has been criticised for blurring the lines of accountability in the Government and that the introduction of the reforms 'have had a negative effect on governance' because departments are no longer necessarily have one political lead. On 28 April 2022, the States voted to scrap the One Government scheme and return to Minister-led government departments by the end of the year.

Departments

Office of the Chief Executive 

The Office of the Chief Executive '[works] to support the Council of Ministers in delivering [the Government of] Jersey's long-term strategic objectives'. It answers to the Council of Ministers as a whole, however its primary Ministers are the Chief Minister, Minister for External Relations and Assistant Chief Minister for Communications. The department is structured into the –

 Office of the Chief of Staff - supports Ministers and day-to-day Government business
 External Relations Directorate - handles Jersey's relationship with other countries, including the UK
 Directorate of Communications - 'aims to inform, educate and persuade islanders so that their daily lives are enhanced by the Government, and their voices are heard by the elected Council of Ministers'

Customer and Local Services 

Customer and Local Services' mission statement is 'CLS's priority is making it easy for customers'. Customer and Local Services is split into three directorates, two of which are split into 'Hubs' –

 Customer Operations Directorate
 Work and Family Hub - income support, work-related benefits, Housing Advisory Service
 Pensions and Care Hub - pensions, long-term care, and income support for pensioners
 Customer Services Directorate
 Business Hub - business licensing, employer contributions and manpower
 Service Hub - registration cards, customs and passports, One Gov support, People Hub
 Local Services Directorate - Superintendendent Registrar, libraries, disability strategy and Crematorium

Children, Young People, Education and Skills 

The department is organsied into four directorates –

 Directorate of Children's Social Care - safeguarding, Children in Need, residential care, fostering and adoption
 Education Directorate - schools, colleges, curriculum, teaching and learning, child care regulation, special educational needs
 Directorate of Young People, Further Education, Higher Education and Skills - skills and lifelong learning, Skills Jersey, Youth Service, Highlands College
 Directorate of Integrated Services and Commissioning - Family and community support, CAMHS, department operations

Economy 

The department for the Economy was established on 1 January 2022 after splitting from the Office of the Chief Executive. The department is organised into four directorates –

 Local and Digital Economy
 High Value Residency
 Digital Economy, including telecoms, cyber and Data Protection
 Local Economy, including well as rural and marine, retail and visitor, aviation, growth, trade and arts and culture
 Financial Services
 Financial Crime Strategy
 Economic Advisory - competition, intellectual property, Economics

Health and Community Services 
The Department of Health and Community Services is the department of the Minister for Health and Social Services. The department is organised into -

 Adult Social Care, Mental Health & Community Services
 Primary and Preventative Care
 Women's, Children's and Family Services
 Surgical and Scheduled Care
 Therapies
 Immediate Care
 Quality and Safety
 Non-Clinical Support Services
 Corporate Nursing
 Service Improvement and Innovation

Infrastructure, Housing and Environment 
The Department of Infrastructure, Housing and Environment manages national infrastructure and the regulation of Jersey's natural and built environment. It employs 678 people and has a £77 million budget, managing £1 billion in property assets. It is organised into four directorates:

 Operations and Transport - maintenance of open spaces, gardens and amenities; management of transport, traffic and waste systems
 Transport Highways and Infrastructure
 Engineering and Development
 Solid Waste Management and Recovery
 Liquid Waste Management
 Technical Support Services
 Sports Operations
 Natural Environment Directorate - Channel Islands Met Office, government vet services, fisheries protection & territorial water management, countryside access, biodiversity and crops and vegetation.
 Marine Resources and Management 
 Biodiversity team
 Office of the Chief Veterinarian
 Land Resource Management
 Meteorology Office
 Property and Capital Delivery - maintenance of States property, delivery of capital projects
 Property Strategy
 Project Delivery
 Estates and Property Maintenance
 Commissioning
 Regulation - Driver and Vehicle Standards (DVS), housing and food regulation, consumer protection, pollution control, town and country planning, border controls for plants and animals
 Development and Land
 Regulatory Improvement
 DVS
 Environmental and Consumer Protection

Justice and Home Affairs 
Justice and Home Affairs manages the island's law enforcement, emergency services, immigration and customs and health and safety services and laws.

The department is split into a number of 'services':

 States of Jersey Ambulance
 States of Jersey Fire & Rescue
 States of Jersey Prison Service
 Jersey Customs and Immigration Service
 Health and Safety Inspectorate
 Official Analyst
 Jersey Field Squadron
 States of Jersey Police

Strategic Policy, Planning and Performance 
Strategic Policy, Planning and Performance 'leads strategic policy, planning and performance to achieve the ambitions of Islanders for the future'.

They are responsible for –

 Future Jersey
 Government strategic policies: Common Strategic Policy, Government Plan and Island Plan
 Policy programme and development
 Legislative programme
 Scenario planning and long-term planning
 Performance analysis, reporting and framework
 Corporate Portfolio Management
 Risk Management

The department is divided into –

 Directorate of Policy - 4 Heads of Policy
 Justice and Criminal Justice Policies
 Education, skills, Family law justice, Structure and government organisation and constitution
 Children, Families, Care Inquiry, Wellbeing and health
 Population and migration, housing, social assistance, social inclusion, diversity and employment and labour markets
 Director of Strategy and Innovation - 
 Sustainability and Foresight: Sustainability; Environment, energy and climate change, Foresight, Development of Future Jersey, Strategy reviews and capability
 Planning Policy and Historic Environment: Planning policy (Island Plan) and supplementary planning guidance, housing land supply, place-making and master-planning, urban design policy, historic environment
 Directorate of Strategic Planning and Performance - 
 Strategic Planning and Accountability: Strategic planning framework, Common strategic policy, Government plan, Department Business Plans, Strengthening public sector accountability, business planning capability
 Strategic Performance Management: strategic performance management framework, corporate annual reports, insight and analysis, performance management capability
 Health and Social Care informatics: information culture across government, Informatics Strategy, health and social care informatics
 Head of Governance
 Delivery planning and performance review
 Best practice governance of resources
 Governance of Department Arms Length Functions
 Department improvement
 Working with partners

Treasury and Exchequer 
The States Treasury is divided into four teams -

 Strategic Finance - long-term financial sustainability of Government
 Business Planning - financial plans and the Government Plan
 Cost-benefit analysis and investment appraisal - investment decisions of the Government
 Business and performance - efficiency, effectiveness and financial control
 Performance, Accounting and Reporting
 Finance Business Partnering - ambassadors in each departments who have financial insight
 Finance Hub - operational centre of management and financial accounting
 Shared Services Centre - services to Government and to customers like suppliers and pensioners
 Group Reporting - financial performance information
 Analytics and Management Information - reporting to stakeholders across government about financial data
 Treasury Investment and Management
 Treasury investment and Management - oversees cash and investment management
 Shareholder relations - acts as the shareholder in States-owned companies
 Risk and Audit
 Internal Audit
 Governance - formal rules and regulations including Public Finances Law
 Risk management
 Revenue Jersey
 Revenue Operations - assessment and collection of taxes
 Revenue Policy and Technical - modernising tax legislation
 International Tax Policy and Operations
 Tax and Information Governance - training for Revenue Jersey, data protection, programme management

Cabinet Office (was Chief Operating Office) 
The Office aims ' to deliver effective public services through the provision of the appropriate people, technology, commercial and support arrangements; and to protect the organisation from external and internal threats to the provision of these services' –

 People & Corporate Services - manages the States of Jersey workforce, skills
 Modernisation & Digital - centralised IT department for States of Jersey
 Commercial Services - procurement, supply chain and commercial

Common Strategic Policy 
The Common Strategic Policy is the Government's high-level ambitions for the island. As of 2023, the Government's proposed Common Strategic Policy consists of 'seven priorities for change':

 Housing and Cost of Living
 Economy and Skills
 Children and Families
 Ageing Population
 Health and Wellbeing
 Environment
 Community

The strategic priorities for the 2018 to 2022 Government contained five strategic priorities, 8 common themes and 5 ongoing initiatives:

 Put children first
 Improve Islander's wellbeing and mental and physical health
 Create a sustainable, vibrant economy
 Reduce income inequality and improve the standard of living
 Protect and value our environment

Local government 

Jersey is divided into 12 parishes, which are further divided into vingtaines (or, in St. Ouen, cueillettes), divisions that are historic. Today they are used chiefly for purposes of local administration and electoral constituency. Each parish has their own Assembly.

See also

Law of Jersey
Politics of Jersey
States Assembly
Council of Ministers

References

External links
 

 
Jersey
Political organisations based in Jersey
Jersey